Hampden–Sydney College (H-SC) is a private liberal arts men's college in Hampden Sydney, Virginia. Founded in 1775, Hampden–Sydney is the oldest privately chartered college in the Southern United States, the tenth-oldest college in the US, the last college founded before the American Declaration of Independence, and the oldest of only three four-year, all-male liberal arts colleges remaining in the United States (alongside Morehouse and Wabash). Hampden–Sydney College is listed on the National Register of Historic Places and the Virginia Landmarks Register. It is affiliated with the Presbyterian Church (USA). Among its alumni is President William Henry Harrison.

History

Founding and early years 
The college's founder and first president, Samuel Stanhope Smith, was born in Pequea, Pennsylvania. He graduated as a valedictorian from the College of New Jersey (now, Princeton University) in 1769, and he went on to study theology and philosophy under John Witherspoon, whose daughter he married on June 28, 1775. In his mid-twenties, working as a missionary in Virginia, Smith persuaded the Hanover Presbytery to found a school east of the Blue Ridge, which he referred to in his advertisement of September 1, 1775 as "an Academy in Prince Edward...distinguished by the Name of HAMPDEN–SIDNEY". The school, not then named, was always intended to be a college-level institution; later in the same advertisement, Smith explicitly models its curriculum on that of the College of New Jersey (now Princeton University). "Academy" was a technical term used for college-level schools not run by the established church.

As the college history indicates on its web site, "The first president, at the suggestion of Dr. John Witherspoon, the Scottish president of the College of New Jersey (now Princeton University), chose the name Hampden–Sydney to symbolize devotion to the principles of representative government and full civil and religious freedom which John Hampden (1594–1643) and Algernon Sydney (1622–1683) had outspokenly supported, and for which they had given their lives, in England's two great constitutional crises of the previous century. They were widely invoked as hero-martyrs by American colonial patriots, and their names immediately associated the College with the cause of independence championed by James Madison, Patrick Henry, and other less well-known but equally vigorous patriots who composed the College's first Board of Trustees."

Classes at Hampden–Sydney began in temporary wooden structures on November 10, 1775, on the eve of American Independence, moving into its three-story brick building early in 1776. The college has been in continuous operation since that date, operating under the British, Confederate, and United States flags. In fact, classes have only been canceled Six times: for a Civil War skirmish on campus, for a hurricane that knocked a tree into a dormitory building, twice due to snowstorms,once for an outbreak of norovirus, and once for a horrible ice storm in 2021 leaving the campus without power. Since the college was founded before the proclamation of the Declaration of Independence on July 4, 1776, it was eligible for an official coat of arms and armorial bearings from the College of Arms of the Royal Household of the United Kingdom. Through gifts from the F. M. Kirby Foundation, Professor John Brinkley ('59), in whose honor the "achievement of arms" was given, liaised with Mr. John Brooke-Little, then the Richmond Herald, in designing the arms for the college. The Latin text of the "letters patent" conferring the arms is dated July 4, 1976; Mr. Brooke-Little—who with the Queen's special permission appeared in full herald's uniform—made the presentation on Yorktown Day, October 19, 1976, at the college.

Despite the difficult and financially strapped first years resulting from the Revolutionary War, the college survived with sufficient viability to be granted a charter by the Virginia General Assembly in 1783—the oldest private charter in the South. Patrick Henry, then Governor of Virginia, encouraged the passage of the charter, and wrote into it an oath of allegiance to the new republic, required of all professors.

The college was founded by alumni of Princeton University. Both Patrick Henry, who did not attend any college, and James Madison, a Princeton alumnus, were elected trustees in the founding period before classes began. Smith hired his brother, John Blair Smith, and two other recent Princeton graduates to teach. Samuel Stanhope Smith would later become president of Princeton University. John Blair Smith would become the second president of Hampden–Sydney and later the first president of Union College.

19th century 

Hampden–Sydney became a thriving college while located in southside Virginia, which led to expansion. In 1812, the Union Theological Seminary was founded at Hampden–Sydney College. The seminary was later moved to Richmond, Virginia and is currently the Union Presbyterian Seminary. In 1838, the medical department of Hampden–Sydney College was founded—the Medical College of Virginia, which is now the MCV Campus of Virginia Commonwealth University. Among the early nineteenth-century leaders were John Holt Rice, who founded the seminary, Jonathan P. Cushing, and Reverend James Marsh.  In those years the intellectual culture at HSC spanned from leading southern, anti-slavery writers like Jesse Burton Harrison and Lucian Minor to leading proslavery writers, such as George A. Baxter and Landon Garland. During this time, the college constructed new buildings using Federal-style architecture with Georgian accents. This is the style of architecture still used on the campus.

At the onset of the American Civil War, Hampden–Sydney students formed a company in the Virginia Militia. The Hampden–Sydney students did not see much action but rather were "captured, and...paroled by General George B. McClellan on the condition that they return to their studies".

20th century 

"Fame has come suddenly to Hampden-Sydney College," began a 1931 New York Times article titled, "Hampden-Sydney's High Scholastic Rank Achieved With Old-Fashioned Teaching." The article highlighted a study showing that of all U.S. colleges and universities, Hampden-Sydney had the highest percentage of living graduates listed in Who's Who.

During World War II, Hampden–Sydney College was one of 131 colleges and universities nationally that took part in the V-12 Navy College Training Program which offered students a path to a commission.

The college has hosted a wide array of noteworthy musicians. Bruce Springsteen, the Temptations, Ben E. King, The Platters, The Lettermen, Dionne Warwick, the Allman Brothers, Dave Matthews Band, Widespread Panic, Bruce Hornsby, Pretty Lights, and Government Mule were among the popular visitors to Hampden–Sydney throughout the latter half of the twentieth century.

On May 11, 1964, Attorney General Robert F. Kennedy visited Hampden–Sydney College to speak with students, and U.S. Vice President George H. W. Bush gave the May 1985 commencement address.

21st century 
As of 2020 Hampden-Sydney had expanded its academic offerings to include more than 50 majors and minors, with recent additions including majors in engineering physics and biochemistry and molecular biology.

In 2017 the college added a new student center and renovated an existing facility to create a state-of-the-art center for the arts. A center for entrepreneurship and innovation was also launched in 2017. In recent years the campus has also added a high ropes course featuring a vertical climbing wall, suspended ropes obstacles, and zip line.

In 2018 the college's Wilson Center for Leadership in the Public Interest launched a four-year leadership development program, with 47 freshmen in the inaugural cohort. The center and program are named for the late Lieutenant General Samuel V. Wilson, a former Hampden-Sydney president who “combined the savvy of a spymaster with the grit of a hardened combat veteran,” according to a 2017 New York Times obituary.

2019 saw the launch of a new experiential learning program called Compass, which requires students to complete at least three experiential learning courses from options including internships, study abroad, research, service learning, and hands-on classroom experiences. A $6 million gift from Cindy and Rob Citrone (class of 1987) was dedicated to support the Compass program.

In August 2020, the college completed a new 147-bed residential complex called the Grove. The lodge-like, apartment-style residence halls are linked by footpaths and a central courtyard. A neighboring community lodge overlooks Lake Chalgrove and features indoor and outdoor fireplaces and grilling space.

Construction began in 2020 on a new, 73,000-square-foot science center. The state-of-the-art Pauley Science Center will be named for the late Stanley F. Pauley, whose $30 million gift in September 2019 made the project possible. The $40 million facility is expected to be completed in the spring of 2022.

Name 
Under the influence of his mentor and father-in-law Witherspoon, Smith named the college for two English champions of liberty, John Hampden (1594–1643) and Algernon Sydney (1622–1683).  Hampden lost his life in the battle of Chalgrove Field during the English Civil War. Sydney, who wrote "Discourses Concerning Government", was beheaded by order of Charles II following his (unproven) implication in a failed attempt to overthrow the king. These proponents of religious and civil liberties were much admired by the founders of the college, all of whom were active supporters of the cause of American independence.

Presidents
The following is a list of the Presidents of Hampden–Sydney College from its opening in 1775 until the present.

Academics
Hampden–Sydney enrolls approximately 1,000 students from 30 states and several foreign countries and emphasizes a rigorous, traditional liberal arts curriculum.

Rankings

 U.S. News & World Report ranked Hampden–Sydney #98 in its 2022 rankings of the top National Liberal Arts Colleges.
 Forbes awarded Hampden–Sydney with an "A" grade in its 2016 Forbes College Financial Grades; an evaluation methodology designed to "measure the fiscal soundness of nearly 900 four-year, private, not-for-profit colleges with at least 500 students".
 The Princeton Review ranked Hampden–Sydney #2 in its 2020 rankings of Best Alumni Network. The Princeton Review also ranked Hampden-Sydney's Bortz Library #5 in its 2020 rankings of Best College Library. In addition, the Princeton Review ranked Hampden-Sydney #14 in its 2020 rankings of Best Schools for Internships.

Honor Code 

In addition to Wabash College and Morehouse College, Hampden–Sydney is one of only three remaining traditional all-male colleges in the United States and is noted as a highly regarded all-male institution of higher education in North America. The school's mission is to "form good men and good citizens in an atmosphere of sound learning". Hampden–Sydney has one of the strictest honor codes of any college or university. Upon entering as a student, each man pledges for life that he will not lie, cheat, steal, nor tolerate those who do. The pledge takes place during a ceremony in which the entering class sits in absolute silence while each man, when his name is called, comes forward and signs the pledge. This simply worded code of behavior applies to the students on and off campus. The Honor Code system is student-run, allowing for a trial by peers, adjudicated by a court of students. Students convicted of an honor offense face anywhere between 1 and 3 semesters of suspension or expulsion. A separate Code of Student Conduct covers "behavioral" infractions e.g. attempting to drink underage, and other offenses that do not rise to the level of an honor offense (which only arise if deception or theft is involved). Thus, in effect, a two-tier system of student discipline is maintained; the Code of Student Conduct (regarding policies on parking or drinking) is enforced by the Dean of Students' Office with the help of the Student Court while the Honor Code system (with more serious penalties for lying, cheating, or stealing) is maintained exclusively by the students themselves. Though grievous violation of the Code of Student Conduct may result in expulsion, it is rare that any student is expelled except by sentencing of the Honor Court.

Western Culture Program 

All Hampden–Sydney students must take two semesters of Western culture as part of a three-course Core Cultures sequence. In addition to the Western Culture courses, which introduce them to some of the great works and historical events from Greece and Rome through present times, students take at least one Global Cultures course, which compares hierarchical structures, cultural frameworks, and regional and global networks from the beginning of human history to the present. Western Culture has been described as "the bedrock of Hampden–Sydney's liberal arts program and one of the most important of its core academic requirements." The Core Cultures program draws on professors from all disciplines.

Rhetoric Program 
The Rhetoric Program is based on a 1978 faculty resolution that states: "All Hampden-Sydney graduates will write and speak competently." Every student must prepare for and pass the Rhetoric Proficiency Exam, which consists of a three-hour essay that is graded for grammatical correctness and the coherence, quality, and style of the argument.

While the program was formalized in 1978, the emphasis on rhetoric dates back to the college's founding. In a September 1775 advertisement in the Virginia Gazette, founding president Samuel S. Smith wrote, “The system of Education will resemble that which is adopted in the College of New Jersey; save, that a more particular Attention shall be paid to the Cultivation of the English Language than is usually done in Places of public Education."

Campus

Before 2006, the college owned . In February 2006, the college purchased  which include a lake and Slate Hill Plantation, the historic location of the college's founding. The campus is host to numerous federal style buildings. Part of the campus has been listed on the National Register of Historic Places as a historic district.

Student life

Culture
Given that it is older than the United States and one of just a handful of colleges for men, Hampden–Sydney College has a distinctive culture that values tradition. When they arrive on campus, freshmen are issued a copy of To Manner Born, To Manners Bred: A Hip-pocket Guide to Etiquette for the Hampden–Sydney Man, which covers basic manners, how to greet and introduce people, how to navigate job interviews, how to respond to invitations, how to dress for various occasions (such as the difference between a black-tie and white-tie event), how to pair wine with food, etc.  The college publishes the book as a useful tool for existing successfully in a variety of social settings. To Manner Born has been highlighted in the New York Times and on the CBS Late Show with Stephen Colbert, who attended Hampden-Sydney in the 1980s.

Tailgating before football games is central to Hampden–Sydney's social culture each fall, and the college's tailgate scene has been featured in Town & Country and Southern Living, which ranked Hampden-Sydney as one of the top-20 best tailgates in the south, alongside large schools like Ole Miss and Alabama.

Many students are passionate outdoorsmen, and Field & Stream has called Hampden-Sydney a "hidden gem for outdoorsmen" in a list of "21 of the Best Colleges for Hunters and Anglers," where the college ranked #7.

Clubs and organizations
There are more than 50 clubs on campus, each of which is run by students. There are political clubs, sports clubs, religious clubs, a student-run radio station, a pep band, and multiple social fraternities. There are also volunteer groups such as Habitat for Humanity and Rotaract.

The 100-year-old student newspaper, The Hampden-Sydney Tiger, has produced many prominent journalists, including Jonathan Martin of the New York Times, Chris Stirewalt of Fox News, Charles Hurt of the Washington Times, Matthew Karnitschnig, the chief Europe correspondent for Politico and a Pulitzer Prize finalist, and Matthew Phillips of CNN, who was previously an editor for Bloomberg Businessweek and Freakonomics.

The college campus is home to a volunteer fire department, which provides fire suppression service and non-transport basic life support EMS to Prince Edward County and the college, as well as assisting the Farmville fire department at fires within the town limits. HSVFD, Company 2, is located on the south end of campus near the water tower and the physical plant. Contrary to popular belief, and despite its location and the fact that 90% of the membership comes from college faculty, staff, and students, the fire department is, in fact, not affiliated with the college.

Union-Philanthropic Literary Society (UPLS) is the oldest student organization at Hampden–Sydney College. Established on September 22, 1789, UPLS is the nation's oldest literary and debating society still in existence today without interruption.

Greek life

For freshmen, rush begins in the first semester and pledging takes place in the spring. If a student chooses not to rush and/or pledge as a freshman, sophomores and juniors may pledge in the fall or spring. Roughly 47% of the student body is involved in Greek life. Beta Theta Pi used Atkinson Hall (built 1834) as a fraternity house when it came to campus in 1850 possibly making it one of the first fraternity houses in North America. However, the first fraternity house built on campus would be the Chi Phi fraternity (Epsilon Chapter) founded in 1867 at H-SC. Chi Psi is widely believed to have created the first fraternity house in 1845 at the University of Michigan.

The following Greek groups were active on campus :
Chi Phi, ΧΦ
Pi Kappa Alpha, ΠΚΑ
Alpha Chi Sigma, ΑΧΣ
Delta Kappa Epsilon, ΔΚΕ
Kappa Sigma, ΚΣ
Sigma Alpha Epsilon, ΣΑΕ
Phi Gamma Delta, ΦΓΔ
Kappa Alpha Order KA
Sigma Nu, ΣΝ
Beta Theta Pi, ΒΘΠ (inactive)
Theta Chi, ΘΧ
Sigma Chi, ΣΧ
Lambda Chi Alpha, ΛΧΑ (inactive)

In addition to the social and professional fraternities listed above, Hampden–Sydney also has chapters of Phi Beta Kappa, the Academic Honor Society; Phi Alpha Theta, the national history honor society; Pi Sigma Alpha, the national political science honor Society; Omicron Delta Kappa, a national leadership honor society and Alpha Psi Omega, a national honors society for theatre arts.

Athletics

Hampden–Sydney athletic teams are the Tigers. The college is a member of the Division III level of the National Collegiate Athletic Association (NCAA), primarily competing in the Old Dominion Athletic Conference (ODAC) since the 1976–77 academic year.

Hampden–Sydney competes in ten intercollegiate varsity sports: Men's sports include baseball, basketball, cross country, football, golf, lacrosse, soccer, swimming & diving, tennis and distance track. The Tigers have rugby as a club sport.

Hampden–Sydney's rivalry with Randolph–Macon College is one of the longest-running college rivalries in the United States. "The Game" is often referred to as the oldest small-school football rivalry in the South, with the first match up having been played in 1893. Athletic events involving the two schools are fiercely competitive, and the week prior to "The Game" between Hampden–Sydney and Randolph–Macon is known as "Beat Macon Week".Several Hampden–Sydney athletes have gone on to successful coaching careers, including Russell Turner, the head coach of the UC Irvine men's basketball team, and Ryan Odom, who led the #16 seed UMBC Retrievers to a historic upset over #1 seed University of Virginia in the 2018 NCAA men's basketball tournament. Ryan Silverfield, an alumnus and former student-assistant with the Hampden–Sydney football program, was named head football coach at the University of Memphis just before the 2019 Cotton Bowl Classic after previously serving as an assistant with the Detroit Lions and Minnesota Vikings.

Notable alumni

References

Bibliography
 Brinkley, John Luster. On This Hill: A narrative history of Hampden Sydney College, 1774–1994. Hampden–Sydney: 1994.

External links 

 
 Official athletics website

 
Private universities and colleges in Virginia
Men's universities and colleges in the United States
1775 establishments in Virginia
Educational institutions established in 1775
Universities and colleges accredited by the Southern Association of Colleges and Schools
National Register of Historic Places in Prince Edward County, Virginia
University and college buildings on the National Register of Historic Places in Virginia
Education in Prince Edward County, Virginia
Buildings and structures in Prince Edward County, Virginia
Historic districts on the National Register of Historic Places in Virginia
Universities and colleges affiliated with the Presbyterian Church (USA)